Langsville is an unincorporated community in western Rutland Township, Meigs County, Ohio, United States, along Leading Creek.  Although it is unincorporated, it has the ZIP code 45741.

Education
Public education in the community of Langsville is provided by the Meigs Local School District. Campuses serving the community include Meigs Primary School (Grades K-2), Meigs Intermediate School (Grades 3-5), Meigs Middle School (Grades 6-8), and Meigs High School (Grades 9-12).

References

Unincorporated communities in Meigs County, Ohio